Clivocast is a settlement on the island of Unst in the Shetland Islands, Scotland at  or  and is situated just east of Uyeasound.

The  Uyea Breck Standing Stone nearby is said to mark the spot where the son of the Viking Harald Harfager was killed some time around 900AD. He is said to have been buried in the tumulus to the southwest.

References

External links

BBC - Domesday Reloaded - Clivocast Farm, Uyeasound 

Villages in Unst
Tumuli in Scotland